Vishwanath Channappa Sajjanar is an Indian law enforcement and police officer who was the Additional Director General of Police (ADGP) of Telangana, now serving as managing director of Telangana State Road Transport Corporation. He is native of Hubballi, Karnataka state. Vishwanath Sajjanar is known to focus on women and child safety issues. He is also known for his strong focus on community and citizen friendly policing, cybercrime and human trafficking. Sajjanar began his career as an Assistant Superintendent of Police of Jangaon (Warangal District). He also served as the Inspector General of Police (Special Intelligence).

Early life
Vishwanath Channappa Sajjanar is a native of Hubballi, Dharwad district, Karnataka state, India. His parents are Channappa and Girija. He was born on 24 October 1968. He did his early education from Lions English Medium School, Hubballi and obtained B.Com degree from J.G.College of Commerce, Hubli, which is affiliated to Karnatak University, Dharwad. V.C. Sajjanar did M.B.A. from Kausali Institute of Management Studies, Dharwad and joined I.P.S. in 1996, after successfully clearing civil services examination conducted by Union Public Services Commission of India (U.P.S.C).

2008 Warangal Acid Attack
In 2008, two female engineering students in Warangal were attacked by three male suspects. The suspects were shot by the Warangal police, who acted in self-defense against an unprovoked attack by the accused. V.C. Sajjanar, was the Superintendent of Police for Warangal district at the time of the incident.

2019 Hyderabad Gangrape
On 6 December, V.C. Sajjanar announced that the four accused in the 2019 Hyderabad gangrape-murder case were shot in self-defense by the Cyberabad Police.

2021 Promoted as Additional DGP 
On 11 March 2021, Vishwanath .C. Sajjanar was promoted to the rank of Addl. DGP.  On 25 August 2021, Sajjanar was transferred From Police Commissioner of Cyberabad to take a new position as managing director of Telangana State Road Transport Corporation.

See also 
 Commissioner of Police- India
 Indian Police Service

References

Living people
Indian Police Service officers
1968 births
People from Hubli
Karnatak University alumni